Constantin Fehrenbach, sometimes falsely, Konstantin Fehrenbach (11 January 1852 – 26 March 1926), was a German Catholic politician who was one of the major leaders of the Centre Party or Zentrum. He served as the president of the Reichstag in 1918, and then as the president of the Weimar National Assembly from 1919 to 1920. In June 1920, Fehrenbach became the chancellor of Germany. He resigned in May 1921 over the issue of war reparation payments to the Allies. Fehrenbach headed the Centre Party's Reichstag fraction from 1923 until his death in 1926.

Early life
Constantin Fehrenbach was born on 11 January 1852 in Wellendingen near Bonndorf in what was then the Grand Duchy of Baden as the son of Johann Georg Fehrenbach, a teacher (1826–1895), and his wife Rosina (1832–1900), née Gensecke.

From 1871 to 1878, Fehrenbach studied theology, then law at Freiburg im Breisgau and in 1882 began to practise law there, soon becoming a successful criminal lawyer. In 1879, Fehrenbach married Maria (1855–1921), née Hossner at Freiburg. They had one daughter.

Political career

Empire
In 1884, Fehrenbach started his political career by becoming a member of the Freiburg city council (parliament). The next year, Fehrenbach became a member of the Landtag (diet) of Baden for the Catholic Zentrum. However, in 1887 he resigned his seat after disagreements with the leader of the party in Baden, . In 1895, Fehrenbach became Stadtrat in Freiburg (member of the city government) and in 1896 Kreisabgeordneter (district representative). In 1901 he was reelected to the Landtag and remained a member until 1913 (in 1907–1909 as president). In 1903, he also became a member of the Reichstag where his oratory skills were widely acclaimed. In particular, his speech on the Saverne Affair in 1913 made him famous nationwide for his defence of the rights of the people of Alsace and all citizens of the German Reich against the powers of the military. In 1917, Fehrenbach became the chairman of the Hauptausschuss of the Reichstag and supported the "peace resolution" in favour of a negotiated peace. In July 1918, Fehrenbach became the last president of the Imperial Reichstag.

Weimar Republic
After the German Revolution of 1918–1919, Fehrenbach once again became president of the parliament, the Weimar National Assembly in February 1919. In that office, he succeeded due to a talent for achieving compromise and a quiet and self-controlled nature. Within the Zentrum, he was a member of the party's right wing.

In June 1920, Fehrenbach formed the first Weimar Republic cabinet without participation of the Social Democratic Party of Germany (SPD). The SPD remained the largest party in the newly elected Reichstag, which succeeded the National Assembly. He tried in vain to get the US government to work as a mediator. In social policy, unemployment benefits were improved during Fehrenbach's time as chancellor, with the maximum benefit for single males over the age of 21 increased in November 1920 from 7 to 10 marks.

Fehrenbach resigned in May 1921, as the DVP had withdrawn its support for the government's foreign policy of trying to cooperate with the Allies on the issue of reparations. In particular, Fehrenbach had failed to get the Reichstag's approval for a fixing of German reparation payments at 132 billion gold mark. Although he officially resigned on 4 May, he remained in charge of the caretaker government until his replacement by Joseph Wirth on 10 May.

In late 1923, Fehrenbach was elected head of the Zentrum fraction in the Reichstag. He remained in that office until his death in 1926.

Later life and death
Fehrenbach died on 26 March 1926 in Freiburg im Breisgau.

References

External links
 The Fehrenbach cabinet at Akten der Reichskanzlei (German)
 

1852 births
1926 deaths
20th-century Chancellors of Germany
People from Waldshut (district)
People from the Grand Duchy of Baden
German Roman Catholics
Centre Party (Germany) politicians
Chancellors of Germany
People of the Weimar Republic
Members of the Reichstag of the German Empire
Members of the Weimar National Assembly
Members of the Reichstag of the Weimar Republic
Members of the Second Chamber of the Diet of the Grand Duchy of Baden
Cartellverband members
University of Freiburg alumni